Conus santaluziensis is a species of sea snail, a marine gastropod mollusc in the family Conidae, the cone snails, cone shells or cones.

These snails are predatory and venomous. They are capable of "stinging" humans.

Description

Distribution

This marine species occurs off Santa Luzia Island, Cape Verde.

References

 Cossignani T. & Fiadeiro R. (2015). Due nuovi coni da Capo Verde. Malacologia Mostra Mondiale. 88: 3-5. page(s): 5

External links
 To World Register of Marine Species

santaluziensis
Gastropods described in 2015
Santa Luzia, Cape Verde
Gastropods of Cape Verde